Bothriocephalidea is an order of Cestoda (tapeworms). Members of this order are gut parasites of vertebrates.

References 

Cestoda
Platyhelminthes orders